When the Pawn... is the shortened title of the second studio album by American singer-songwriter Fiona Apple. Released by Epic Records in the United States on November 9, 1999, When the Pawn... was wholly written by Apple, with production by Jon Brion.

In 2010, Spin magazine named the album the 106th greatest of the last 25 years, and Slant Magazine named it the 79th best album of the 1990s. The album received a Grammy Award nomination for Best Alternative Album. In 2020, Rolling Stone ranked When the Pawn... at number 108 on its "500 Greatest Albums of All Time" list.

Title
The album's title is a poem Apple wrote in response to unfavorable reactions from readers of an unfavorable Spin magazine cover story about her. Richard Harrington of The Washington Post called it Apple's version of Chumbawamba's "I get knocked down, but I get up again". "It came from being made fun of," she said, "and then, of course, it becomes a thing I'm being made fun of for."

Upon its release, When the Pawn... broke the record for longest album title at 444 characters (previously held by a volume in The Best... Album in the World...Ever!). Chumbawamba themselves would later hold the record with 2008's The Boy Bands Have Won, whose full title contains 865 characters, nearly twice as many as When the Pawn...'s.

The full title is:

Release
The first single, "Fast as You Can", was fairly popular and received moderate radio and video airplay. It reached the top 20 on the US Billboard Modern Rock Tracks chart and became Apple's first top 40 hit on the UK Singles Chart. The follow-up singles, "Limp" and especially "Paper Bag", which was nominated for a Grammy Award, were less successful. Apple's boyfriend at the time, filmmaker Paul Thomas Anderson, directed videos for all three singles.

In 2019, Apple collaborated with King Princess on a cover of "I Know". The song was released for Spotify's RISE program on January 25. A reissue by Vinyl Me Please was announced in 2020 featuring a new cover chosen by Fiona herself, marking the album's first ever vinyl pressing.

Reception

In comparison to Apple's debut album Tidal, Harrington stated, "When the Pawn is a decidedly more mature work that trades in youthful melodrama for somber ruminations on shattered relationships and romantic obsession". In The New Rolling Stone Album Guide, Jenny Eliscu states that Pawn is "more musically complex and melodically advanced" than the previous album, while focusing on Apple's "sultry voice and moody piano playing". Rob Sheffield of Rolling Stone gave the album three-and-a-half out of five stars, calling it "richer, deeper and stronger than Tidal, in every way", with "a far more muscular approach to both the songs and the singing". Entertainment Weeklys David Browne awarded the album an A grade, praising Jon Brion's production as well as Apple's songwriting: "Apple hasn't gained much in psychic confidence following the success of Tidal. On When the Pawn..., Apple presents herself as a mental shambles, and she’s more than happy to tell us about it." Pitchfork originally gave the album a score of eight out of ten, with reviewer Chip Chanko praising Apple's lyrics, writing: "[Apple] seems older. Her voice is full of a heartfelt soul that seems almost timeless. While Billie Holiday would never have considered the possibility of lines like, 'It won't be long till you'll be/ Lying limp in your own hand,' Apple executes them flawlessly with a modern passion. Amy Linden of Vibe wrote: "When the Pawn... is full of images that resonate. Apple's a sad, sultry woman with a sense of who she is—even if that person isn't someone she wants to be. Once again, her pain brings us joy." Piers Martin of NME rated it a 5 out of 10, calling it Apple's "second album of Amos-aping MTV-branded Lilith Fair fodder."

On the U.S. Billboard 200, When the Pawn.. debuted at number 13 with 103,000 copies sold in first week. As of 2005, sales of the album in the United States had exceeded 922,000 copies, according to Nielsen SoundScan. On March 26, 2020, When the Pawn.. was certified Platinum by the Recording Industry Association of America.

Track listing

Personnel

 Fiona Apple – piano, vocals, synthesized bass 
 Jon Brion – bass, keyboards, vibraphone, guitars, drums, percussion
 John Bainbridge – orchestration
 Robert Becker – viola
 Charlie Bisharat – violin
 Mike Breaux – woodwind
 Denyse Buffman – viola
 Jonathan "Butch" Norton – drums, percussion
 Eve Butler – violin
 Matt Chamberlain – percussion, drums
 Susan Chatman – violin
 Greg Cohen – bass guitar
 Larry Corbett – cello
 Mike Elizondo – bass guitar
 Armen Garabedian – violin
 Berj Garabedian – violin
 Scott Haupert – viola
 Suzie Katayama – cello
 Wendell Kelly – horn
 Jim Keltner – drums
 Peter Kent – violin
 Brian Leonard – violin
 Maria Newman – viola
 Robert Peterson – violin
 Michele Richards – violin
 Edmund Stein – violin
 Patrick Warren – Chamberlin, Wurlitzer
 John Wittenberg – violin

Production

 Jon Brion – producer, mixing, assistant engineer
 Rich Costey – mixer / engineer
 Tom Banghart – assistant engineer
 Rob Brill – assistant engineer
 Greg Collins – assistant engineer
 Bryan Jackson – assistant engineer
 Steve Mixdorf – assistant engineer
 John Tyree – assistant engineer
 Eddy Scheyer – mastering
 Valerie Pack – production coordination
 Rich Costey – programming
 John Bainbridge – arranger
 Ian Sefchick – vinyl mastering (2020)
 Fiona Apple – design, cover art concept
 Hooshik– art direction

Charts

Weekly charts

Year-end charts

Certifications and sales

Notes

References

External links

 
 

1999 albums
Albums produced by Jon Brion
Epic Records albums
Fiona Apple albums
Jazz albums by American artists